The Calder High School is a coeducational comprehensive school. It specialises in technology, with technology rooms. It is located in the village of Mytholmroyd, in the metropolitan district of Calderdale, in northern England.

Admissions
As of the academic year 2006-7, it had 1,294 pupils. At the start of the 2010-1 term, Calder High had a total of 27 new teachers including the new Head Teacher Mrs. Spillane.

From September 2013 the school has a new Head Teacher, Mr Anthony Guise.

It is situated in the middle of the village, north of the A646.

History

Grammar school
In the early 1950s, the school had  around 350 boys and girls

Comprehensive
Calder High opened in May 1952 as one of the first comprehensives in the country, replacing the older Hebden Bridge Grammar school. On 28 December 1969, Songs of Praise was shown from the school. By the 1970s it had 1200 boys and girls. Until April 1974, it was administered by the Calder Divisional Executive of West Riding County Council. In November 1994, thirteen-year-old Lindsay Rimer was murdered, which has not been solved.

Buildings
In 1963, a new science block and bus bays were added. More recently, a new Sixth Form building was added and officially opened on 12 July 2004 by outgoing headteacher David Scott. At the start of the 2007 academic year, the Ted Hughes theatre was opened and  named under the consent of Ted Hughes's widow.

There was speculation about plans to rebuild the school on the present school field. Chris McCafferty MP said that this would only happen once Todmorden High School was rebuilt. On 11 December 2008, the school was visited by Nick Gibb MP (then shadow minister for schools) to discuss its rebuilding in the near future. During his visit, he became involved in a heated debate with a small group of students who challenged his negative views regarding comprehensive education and his advocation of a private sector role in schools.

In April 2019, the school car park just off Brier Hey Lane became decommissioned to become the ground for the new state of the art English teaching block containing nine brand new classrooms to provide children a more high quality learning space. This project was completed in August 2019 and was opened ready for the 2019-2020 academic year in September 2019.

Activities
In October 2006, the school obtained a license to run a week-long radio station, broadcast directly from the school. The radio was named Royd FM. The success of this project led to Royd FM broadcasting again in December 2007.

In January 2007 a student-run business was opened in school; Under the Stairs, selling snacks at break times and lunches. The two students - Matthew Dawson and Jack Walsh both received awards for their Entrepreneur skills.

Each year students of Calder High put on the Easter-time performance of the Pace Egg Play in the surrounding area. This is a very big hit with the locals, with thousands of people coming to see it from around the world. This year (2013) the play is being run by Thomas Jennings and Jack Deighton.

All-through school
Calder High School is federated with Calder Primary School under the title of The Calder Learning Trust. This means that technically it is an all-through school educating pupils aged 4 to 16. However, while management and administration is shared, both schools continue to operate with separate identities.

Alumni
 Kirk Barker, actor
 Dario Coates, actor
 Geoff Crowther, guidebook writer
 Stuart Fielden, former professional rugby league footballer
 Jessica Harris, actress
 Thomas Nelstrop, actor, comedian, and voiceover artist
 Lindsay Rimer, victim of unsolved murder in 1994
 Robert Scott, professional cyclist and former u23 British Champion

Hebden Bridge Grammar School
 Paul Barker, broadcaster, editor from 1968-86 of New Society
 Sir Bernard Ingham, journalist and former civil servant

Accreditation
 Technology College
 Training School

References

External links
 Calder High School website

News items
 Teacher suspended in 2009
 Radio Five Live July 2009

Secondary schools in Calderdale
Educational institutions established in 1952
Foundation schools in Calderdale
1952 establishments in England
Specialist technology colleges in England
Mytholmroyd